Chaos in Motion 2007–2008 is a DVD from the progressive metal band Dream Theater. Released on September 30, 2008, the DVD contains a compilation of live concerts from the band's Chaos in Motion Tour, in support of their 9th studio album Systematic Chaos. This was also the band’s last official live album to be released with their founding member and drummer Mike Portnoy before his departure from the band in September 2010. The tour, which lasted from June 3, 2007, to June 4, 2008, contained 115 shows throughout 35 countries. Two forms of the DVD were released, a 2-disc set and a 5-disc (2 DVD, 3 CD) special edition. The special edition was limited to 5,000 copies.

Recordings 
 August 18, 2007 at Molson Amphitheater in Toronto: "Blind Faith", "Surrounded (Extended Version)"
 August 21, 2007 at Bank of America Pavilion in Boston: "Jordan Rudess Keyboard Solo", "Lines in the Sand", "Scarred"
 October 9, 2007 at Rotterdam Ahoy in The Netherlands: "Intro/Also Sprach Zarathustra", "Constant Motion", "The Dark Eternal Night", "In the Presence of Enemies"
 January 18, 2008 at Bangkok Hall in Bangkok: "Take the Time"
 March 4, 2008 at Luna Park in Buenos Aires: "Panic Attack"
 May 6, 2008 at Orpheum Theater in Vancouver: "Forsaken", "The Ministry of Lost Souls", "Schmedley Wilcox"

Track listing

DVD 

Disc one
 Intro/Also sprach Zarathustra
 Constant Motion
 Panic Attack
 Blind Faith
 Surrounded
 The Dark Eternal Night
 Keyboard Solo
 Lines in the Sand
 Scarred
 Forsaken
 The Ministry of Lost Souls
 Take the Time
 In the Presence of Enemies
 Schmedley Wilcox:
 I. Trial of Tears
 II. Finally Free
 III. Learning to Live
 IV. In the Name of God
 V. Octavarium: V - Razor's Edge

Disc two
 "Behind the Chaos on the Road"  (90-minute Documentary)
 Promo videos
 Constant Motion
 Forsaken
 Forsaken (Studio Footage)
 The Dark Eternal Night (Studio Footage)
 Live Screen Projection Films:
 The Dark Eternal Night (N.A.D.S.)
 The Ministry of Lost Souls
 In the Presence of Enemies, Pt. 2
 "Mike Portnoy Stage Tour"
 "Mike Portnoy Backstage Tour"
 Photo Gallery

Special edition CD 
The Special Edition 5-disc set includes the 2 DVDs as specified above as well as the audio tracks on a 3-disc set.
All music written by Dream Theater except where noted.

Personnel 
Dream Theater
James LaBrie – vocals
 John Myung – bass
 John Petrucci – guitar, vocals, producer
 Mike Portnoy – drums, vocals, producer, creative director
 Jordan Rudess – keyboards

Production
 Sebastian Beloch – director, editing, filmmaker
 Andrew Bennett – director
 Lasse Hoile – director
 Jared Kvitka – engineer
 Randy Lane – engineer, mixing
 Kevin Shirley – mixing
 Ryan Smith – mastering
 Yasufumi Soejima – director
 Hugh Syme – artwork, design
 Mika Tyyskä – director

References

External links 
 Official trailer at Roadrunner Records

Dream Theater video albums
2008 live albums
2008 video albums
Live video albums
Documentary films about heavy metal music and musicians
Roadrunner Records live albums
Roadrunner Records video albums